Georgia Rule is a 2007 American comedy-drama film directed by Garry Marshall, written by Mark Andrus, and starring Jane Fonda, Lindsay Lohan, Felicity Huffman, Dermot Mulroney, Cary Elwes, and Garrett Hedlund. The original score was composed by John Debney.

Georgia Rule was theatrically released by Universal Pictures on May 11, 2007, and received generally negative reviews from critics, but the lead cast (Fonda, Lohan and Huffman) was praised for their performances.

Plot

Rachel is a promiscuous, heavy-drinking teenager, whose drug addiction and rebellious ways are starting to spiral out of control. With her latest car crash, she has violated the final rule in her mother Lily's San Francisco home. With nowhere else to take her, Lily hauls her to the one place she swore she would never return to: her grandmother Georgia's house in Idaho.

Georgia lives life by a few definitive rules—God comes first and hard work reigns—and whoever is under her roof must do the same. Saddled with her granddaughter for the summer, she needs great patience to understand her fury. Georgia gets her a receptionist job for Dr. Simon Ward, the local veterinarian, who also treats people. His nephews, Sam and Ethan, are often at Georgia's.

As Simon does not show interest in Rachel or other women, she thinks he is gay. However, his sister Paula tells her he is mourning the death of his wife and son, killed in a car collision three years earlier. He refuses to have sex with Rachel even when she tries to seduce him, but retains some feelings for her mother Lily, who he once dated.

Rachel performs oral sex on Harlan Wilson, not yet married and still a virgin because of his LDS (Mormon) religion. He confesses to his girlfriend, June, who is shocked. Later, a team of LDS girls spy on Harlan and Rachel to make sure he does not have sex again. After chasing them with Harlan's truck, Rachel explains to them that what happened was over and they can go back to having their summer fun.

They agree, but tell Rachel to go home, leading her to threaten them by saying if they have anything to do with her and Harlan again, she will find all of their boyfriends and "fuck them stupid". That is when they stop insulting her and spying on them.

While trying to make a point to Simon about survival, Rachel bluntly says that her stepfather, Arnold, sexually molested her from 12 until she turned 14. Seeing the effect of her revelation, Rachel tries to convince him she lied. However, Simon tells Georgia about the abuse, and in turn, Georgia tells Lily, who thinks she is lying.

Heartbroken, Lily comes to believe her daughter. She begins to drink heavily and asks Arnold for a divorce. When he arrives, Georgia tells him to leave, refusing to let him in the house, she hits him with a baseball bat, and finally threatens his new red Ferrari. Rachel sees that Lily cannot accept the truth, so lies to her about being molested.

At the motel where Arnold is staying, Rachel tells him that she has a video tape of them having sex when she was 14 and he seems worried. She demands $10 million if he does not keep Lily happy and admits to him she lied about him molesting her to Lily because she does not want her to be upset anymore. On the way back to San Francisco, when Arnold tells Lily that he is giving Rachel his Ferrari, she realizes he is guilty.

Lily starts a raging argument/attack and Arnold finally admits to having molested Rachel, saying she seduced him, Lily's alcoholism drove him to it, and that Rachel enjoyed it. Arnold drives off and leaves her to walk back. Georgia, Simon, Rachel, and Harlan catch up with her in Harlan's pick-up, and a tearful Rachel apologizes to her mother for her behavior. Harlan tells Georgia that he is in love with Rachel, and plans to marry her when he returns from his two-year mission.

Cast

Production
Ostensibly set in Idaho, per the ending credits and DVD extras, the film was actually shot in Southern California, and much of the scenery was created with CGI.

The production of the film came to media attention when a warning letter from Morgan Creek Productions CEO James G. Robinson to Lindsay Lohan was leaked online on The Smoking Gun; in it, he criticized her heavy partying and lateness on set, calling her "discourteous, irresponsible and unprofessional", comparing her to a "spoiled child."

Release

Critical reception
Georgia Rule received generally negative reviews from critics. The film earned a Rotten rating on the website Rotten Tomatoes, with a score of 19% from 118 reviews. The site's consensus states: "Comedic and dramatic in all the wrong places, Georgia Rule is a confused dramedy that wastes the talents of its fine cast." The film also had a low rating on Metacritic with a score of 25, indicating "generally unfavorable reviews". Audiences polled by CinemaScore gave the film an average grade of "B-" on an A+ to F scale.

Georgia Rule was rated the #2 worst movie of 2007 by AOL. The film received "two thumbs down" from Ebert and Roeper, with the guest critic calling it "Lindsay Lohan's Gigli" (many critics would compare Lohan's following star vehicle, I Know Who Killed Me, to Gigli) and "a sitcom about sexual abuse".

Home media
Georgia Rule was released on DVD on September 4, 2007. The Blu-ray was released by the Shout! Factory, under their Shout Select label, on July 12, 2022.

Awards and nominations

The film received two nominations at the 2007 Teen Choice Awards, for "Choice Movie – Chick Flick" and "Choice Actress – Drama" for Lohan's performance. Felicity Huffman received a Prism Award nomination for "Best Performance in a Feature Film", with the movie winning "Best Feature Film".

References

External links

 
 
 
 
 
 New York Times Review

2000s American films
2007 films
2007 comedy-drama films
2000s coming-of-age comedy-drama films
2000s English-language films
American coming-of-age comedy-drama films
Films about dysfunctional families
Films directed by Garry Marshall
Films scored by John Debney
Films set in Idaho
Films set in San Francisco
Films shot in Los Angeles
Mormonism in fiction
Morgan Creek Productions films
Films about mother–daughter relationships
Universal Pictures films